The Investors Group Athletic Centre is a facility in Winnipeg that was constructed for the 1999 Pan-American Games. The  building, located next to the Max Bell Centre and IG Field on the University of Manitoba campus, features seating area for over 3,000 spectators. The building serves as the permanent home of the Canadian national basketball and volleyball teams as well as the Manitoba Bisons basketball and volleyball teams.

References

Sports venues in Winnipeg
Venues of the 1999 Pan American Games
University sports venues in Canada
Basketball venues in Canada
Volleyball venues in Canada
University of Manitoba
Indoor arenas in Manitoba